Oberhoffen-sur-Moder is a commune in the Bas-Rhin department in Grand Est in north-eastern France.

Population

Notable people
 Sébastien Loeb, French rally and racing driver
Charles Miller, born Oberhoffen-sur-Moder, June 15, 1843, commander the organization now known as the 28th Infantry Division and founder of the Galena-Signal Oil Company, which became part of the Standard Oil combine, and then part of the corporation now known as Texaco.

See also
 Communes of the Bas-Rhin department

References

Communes of Bas-Rhin
Bas-Rhin communes articles needing translation from French Wikipedia